Lesbian, gay, bisexual and transgender (LGBT) people in Iran face severe legal challenges not experienced by non-LGBT residents. Sexual activity between members of the same sex is illegal and can be punishable by up to death, and people can legally change their assigned sex only through a sex reassignment surgery.

LGBT rights in Iran have come in conflict with the penal code since the 1930s. In post-revolutionary Iran, any type of sexual activity outside a heterosexual marriage is forbidden. Same-sex sexual activities are punishable by imprisonment, corporal punishment, fines, or execution. Gay men have faced stricter enforcement actions under the law than lesbians.

The government of Iran is considered to be one of the most discriminatory towards homosexuals in the world. It is estimated that hundreds or thousands of people were executed in the immediate aftermath of revolution of whom some 20 were homosexuals. Ruhollah Khomeini called for them to be exterminated in 1979.

Transgender identity is recognized through a sex reassignment surgery. Sex reassignment surgeries are partially financially supported by the state. Some homosexual individuals in Iran have been pressured to undergo sex reassignment surgery in order to avoid legal and social persecution. Iran carries out more sex reassignment surgeries than any other country in the world after Thailand.

LGBT history in Iran 

Around 250 BC, during the Parthian Empire, the Zoroastrian text Vendidad was written. It contains provisions that are part of sexual code promoting procreative sexuality that is interpreted to prohibit same-sex intercourse as sinful. Ancient commentary on this passage suggests that those engaging in sodomy could be killed without permission from a high priest. However, a strong homosexual tradition in Iran is attested to by Greek historians from the 5th century onward, and so the prohibition apparently had little effect on Iranian attitudes or sexual behavior outside the ranks of devout Zoroastrians in rural eastern Iran.

There is a significant amount of literature in Persian that contain explicit same-sex illustrations. A few Persian love poems and texts from prominent medieval Persian poet Saadi Shirazi's Bustan and Gulistan have also been interpreted as homoerotic poems.

Under the rule of Mohammad Reza Shah, the last monarch of the Pahlavi dynasty, homosexuality was criminalised, though it was mostly tolerated even to the point of allowing news coverage of a mock same-sex wedding. Janet Afary has argued that the 1979 Revolution was partly motivated by moral outrage against the Shah's government, and in particular against a mock same-sex wedding between two young men with ties to the court. She says that this explains the virulence of the anti-homosexual oppression in Iran. After the 1979 Revolution, thousands of people were executed in public, including some homosexuals.

Legality of same-sex sexual activity 
Since the 1979 Revolution, the legal code has been based on Islamic law. All sexual activities that occur outside a traditional, heterosexual marriage (i.e., sodomy or adultery) are illegal. Same-sex sexual activities that occur between consenting adults are criminalized and carry a maximum punishment of death—though not generally implemented. Rape, whether same-sex or opposite-sex, often results in execution, but is related to adultery and sodomy in Iran's penal code rather than being classified as "sexual assault". The death penalty is legal for those above 18, and if a murder was committed, legal at the age of 15. Approved by the Parliament on July 30, 1991, and finally ratified by the Guardian Council on November 28, 1991, articles 108 through 140 distinctly deal with same-sex sexual activities and their punishments in detail.

Male same-sex sexual activity 
According to Articles 108 to 112, sodomy (lavāt) can in certain circumstances be a crime for which both partners can be punished by death. If the participants are adults, of sound mind, and consenting, the method of execution is for the judge to decide. If one person is non-consenting (i.e., rape), the punishment would only apply to the rapist. A non-adult who engages in consensual sodomy is subject to a punishment of 74 lashes. Articles 114 to 119 assert that sodomy is proved either if a person confesses four times to having committed sodomy or by the testimony of four righteous men. Testimony of women alone or together with a man does not prove sodomy. According to Articles 125 and 126, if sodomy or any lesser crime referred to above, is proved by confession and the person concerned repents, the judge may request that he be pardoned. If a person who has committed the lesser crimes referred to above repents before the giving of testimony by the witnesses, the punishment is quashed. The judge may punish the person for lesser crimes at his discretion.

Female same-sex sexual activity 
According to Articles 127, 129, and 130, the punishment for female same-sex sexual activity (mosāheqe) involving persons who are mature, of sound mind and consenting, is 100 lashes.  If the act is repeated three times and punishment is enforced each time, the death sentence will apply on the fourth occasion.  Article 128 asserts that the ways of proving female same-sex sexual activity in court are the same as for sodomy.  Article 130 says that both Muslims and non-Muslims are subject to the punishment.  According to Articles 132 and 133, the rules for the quashing of sentences, or for pardoning, are the same as for the lesser male homosexual offenses.  According to Article 134, women who "stand naked under one cover without necessity" and are not relatives may receive a punishment of 50 lashes.

At the discretion of the Iranian court, fines, prison sentences, and corporal punishment are usually carried out rather than the death penalty, unless the crime was a rape.

The charges of same-sex sexual activity have in a few occasions been used in political crimes. Other charges had been paired with the sodomy crime, such as rape or acts against the state, and convictions are obtained in grossly flawed trials. On March 14, 1994, famous dissident writer Ali Akbar Saidi Sirjani was charged with offenses ranging from drug dealing to espionage to homosexual activity. He died in prison under disputed circumstances.

Adultery 
Adultery (zina-e-mohsen) is punishable by 100 lashes for unmarried people and by death on the fourth offense. It is punishable by death by stoning (under moratorium since 2002, officially replaced in 2012, by an unspecified punishment) for married people and in all cases of incest. If an unmarried non-Muslim male has sexual relations with a Muslim female, the non-Muslim male will be put to death. Four witnesses (rather than two witnesses) are required to prove adultery, the person must confess four times, or they must be convicted by judge's knowledge (through definite circumstantial evidence). If the person confesses twice and is "repentant" or the victim's family forgives the adulterer, the judge can give a tazir sentence of 99 lashes instead, or imprisonment. Convictions and executions for this crime are extremely rare, usually only carried out in the case of death and rare even then.

In November 2021, a married Iranian man and his male lover were given the death penalty for adultery. The couple, who were 27 and 33 years old, were expected to be hanged, even though the man's wife pleaded with the authorities to spare their lives.
However, because of his son-in-law's adultery, the woman's father intervened and asked that the men be executed. The judge upheld her father's request.

Public morality laws
Under more public morality laws, offenders face additional jail time, whippings, and fines.

Article 637 – Any man and woman who are not married and who commit a crime against public morality,
excluding adultery, should be sentenced to flogging (99 lashes). If one of them did not consent to the crime,
then only the one who initiated the crime should be punished.
Article 638- Anyone who explicitly violates any religious taboo in public beside being punished for the act
should also be imprisoned from ten days to two months, or should be flogged (74 lashes).
Note- women who appear in public without a proper hijab should be imprisoned from ten days to two months or
pay a fine of 50,000 to 500,000 Ryal.
Article 639 – The following people should be imprisoned from one to ten years, and in the case of category (a)
the property should be confiscated according to decision of the court.
a) anyone who manages a property where activities against public morality take place;
b) anyone who encourages people to violate public morality;
Article 640 – The following people should be imprisoned from three months to one year and pay a fine of
1,500,000 to 6,000,000, and also be flogged up to 74 lashes, or any of these punishments.
c) anyone who publicizes any picture, text, photo, drawing, article, newsletter, newspaper, movie, or any
other thing that violates public morality;
d) anyone who is included in the circulation of the above items;

Capital punishment 

Some human rights activists and opponents of the government in Iran claim between 4,000 and 6,000 gay men and lesbians have been executed in Iran for crimes related to their sexual orientation since 1979. According to The Boroumand Foundation, there are records of at least 107 executions with charges related to homosexuality between 1979 and 1990. According to Amnesty International, a male homosexual was executed in January 1990 under unclear circumstances that is no reason was given. At least five people convicted of homosexual activity, three men and two women were executed in January 1990 as a result of the government policy of demanding executions of those who "practice homosexuality".

In a November 2007 meeting with his British counterpart, Iranian member of parliament Mohsen Yahyavi admitted that the government in Iran believes in the death penalty for homosexuality. According to Yahyavi, gays deserve to be executed. He said that if they do it privately then it's okay but if they do it overtly then they are to be executed.

LGBT rights activists Zahra Seddiqi Hamedani and Elham Choubdar were sentenced to death in 2021 by a court in Iran for "promoting homosexuality, promoting Christianity and communicating with media opposed to the Islamic Republic". The sentence was confirmed by Iran's judiciary, but said the charges involved "human trafficking and not activism". On September 5, 2022, Iran's official IRNA news agency reported that the two women had been sentenced to death on charges of "corruption on earth" and human tracking. The European Union condemned the death sentences on September 13, 2022.

Sodomy 

Few consenting participants of sodomy (lavāt) are sentenced to death, but prior to 2012, both partners could receive the death penalty. On March 15, 2005, the daily newspaper Etemad reported that the Tehran Criminal Court sentenced two men to death following the discovery of a video showing them engaged in sexual acts to which they confessed. Another two men were allegedly hanged publicly in the northern town of Gorgan for sodomy in November 2005. In July 2006, two youths in north-eastern Iran were hanged for "sex crimes", probably consensual homosexual acts. On November 16, 2006, the State-run news agency reported the public execution of a man convicted of sodomy in the western city of Kermanshah. In January 2022, two gay men allegedly sentenced for "forced sexual intercourse between two men" were executed in the city of Maragheh after spending six years on death row.

Arrests 
On January 23, 2008, Hamzeh Chavi, 18, and Loghman Hamzehpour, 19, were arrested in Sardasht, West Azerbaijan, for homosexual activity. An on-line petition for their release began to circulate around the internet. They apparently confessed to the authorities that they were in a relationship and in love, prompting a court to charge them with mohārebe ("waging war against God") and lavāt (sodomy).

There were two reported crackdowns in Isfahan, Iran's third-largest city. On May 10, 2007, Isfahan police arrested 87 people at a birthday party, including 80 suspected gay men, beating and detaining them through the weekend. All but 17 of the men were released. Those who remained in custody were believed to have been wearing women's clothing. Photos of the beaten men were released by the Toronto-based Iranian Railroad for Queer Refugees. According to Human Rights Watch, in February 2008, the police in Isfahan raided a party in a private home and arrested 30 men, who were held indefinitely without a lawyer on suspicion of homosexual activity.

In April 2017, 30 men were arrested in a raid in Isfahan Province, "charged with sodomy, drinking alcohol and using psychedelic drugs".

Recognition of same-sex relationships 
Same-sex marriage and civil unions are not legally recognized in Iran. Traditional Iranian families often exercise strong influence in whom, and when, their children marry and even what profession they chose. Few LGBT Iranians come out to family due to the fear of being rejected. No legislation exists to address discrimination or bias motivated violence on the basis of sexual orientation or gender identity.

Traditional Iranian families tend to prohibit their children from dating, as it is not a part of Iranian culture, although this has become somewhat more tolerated, among liberals. In 2004, an independent film was released, directed by Maryam Keshavarz, that examined the changing mores of Iranian youth when it comes to sex and dating.

Gay Iranian couples are often afraid to be seen together in public, and report that LGBT people were widely stereotyped as being sex-obsessed child molesters, rapists, and disease-ridden.

Gender identity and expression 

As Article 20 in Clause 14 states, a person who has sex reassignment surgery can legally change their name and gender on the birth certification upon the order of court.

Those who are in favor of legitimately being able to reassign one's sex surgically utilize article 215 of Iran's civil code, stating that the acts of every person should be subject to rational benefit, meaning gender reassignment surgery would be in the best interest of whoever is appealing for governmental support. Caveats, however, include the need to have medical approval from a doctor that supports a dissonance between assigned gender and their true gender.
 
Although legally recognized by the current Supreme Leader in Iran, Grand Ayatollah Ali Khamenei, Grand Ayatollah Yousef Madani Tabrizi addresses gender reassignment surgery as "unlawful" and "not permissible by Sharia (Islamic law)". Reasons for his contestation include the altering of God's creation and disfiguration of vital organs as being unlawful.

Since the mid-1980s, the Iranian government has legalized the practice of sex reassignment surgery (under medical approval) and the modification of pertinent legal documents to reflect the reassigned gender. In 1983, Khomeini passed a fatwa allowing gender reassignment operations as a cure for "diagnosed transsexuals", allowing for the basis of this practice becoming legal.

Some homosexual individuals in Iran have been pressured to undergo sex reassignment surgery in order to avoid legal and social persecution. Tanaz Eshaghian's 2008 documentary Be Like Others highlighted this. The documentary explores issues of gender and sexual identity while following the personal stories of some of the patients at a gender reassignment clinic in Tehran. The film was featured at the Sundance Film Festival and the Berlin International Film Festival, winning three awards. Sarah Farizan's novel If You Could Be Mine explores the relationship between two young girls, Sahar and Nisrin, who live in Iran through gender identity and the possibility of undergoing gender reassignment surgery. In order for the two to be in an open relationship, Sahar considers surgery to work within the confines of law which permits relationships after transitioning due to the relationship being between a male and female.

Trans men and trans women are treated differently from each other in Iranian society. Trans men are more visible socially and are able to find acceptance in society more easily than trans women, who are often misgendered and put in the same category as gay men.

Blood donation 

Homosexuals and bisexuals are banned from donating blood in Iran. The ban also extends to lesbians.

Censorship 

In 2002, a book entitled Witness Play by Cyrus Shamisa was banned from shelves (despite being initially approved) because it said that certain notable Persian writers were homosexuals and bisexuals.

In 2004, the Tehran Museum of Contemporary Art loaned a collection of artwork that formerly belonged to Shah Mohammed Reza Pahlavi that had been locked away since the Revolution in 1979 to the Tate Britain. The artwork included explicit homoerotic artwork by Francis Bacon and the government in Iran stated that upon its return, it would also be put on display in Iran.

In 2005, the Iranian Reformist paper Shargh was shut down by the government after it interviewed an Iranian author, living in Canada. While the interview never mentioned the sexual orientation of Saghi Ghahreman, it did quote her as stating that, "sexual boundaries must be flexible... The immoral is imposed by culture on the body". The conservative paper Kayhan attacked the interview and the paper, "Shargh has interviewed this homosexual while aware of her sick sexual identity, dissident views and porno-personality." To avoid being permanently shut down, the paper issued a public apology stating it was unaware of the author's "personal traits" and promised to "avoid such people and movements."

Violence 
In May 2021, a 20-year-old Iranian was murdered, allegedly by his half-brother and cousins, days after the military mailed him a document exempting him from military service because of his sexual orientation.

LGBT Iranians have fled Iran in recent years hoping to gain asylum in Europe.

Exiled political parties and groups 
The government in Iran does not allow a political party or organization to endorse LGBT rights. Vague support for LGBT rights in Iran has fallen to a handful of exiled political organizations.

The Green Party of Iran has an English translation of its website that states, "Every Iranian citizen is equal by law, regardless of gender, age, race, nationality, religion, marital status, sexual orientation, or political beliefs" and calls for a "separation of state and religion".

The Worker Communist Party of Iran homepage has an English translation of its manifesto that supports the right of "All adults, women or men" to be "completely free in deciding over their sexual relationships with other adults. Voluntary relationship of adults with each other is their private affair and no person or authority has the right to scrutinize it, interfere with it or make it public".

The leftist Worker's Way, the liberal Glorious Frontiers Party, and the center-right Constitutionalist Party of Iran have all expressed support for the separation of religion and the state, which might promote LGBT rights.

LGBT rights movement 

In 1972, scholar Saviz Shafaie gave a public lecture on homosexuality at Shiraz University and in 1976 would research sexual orientation and gender issues at Syracuse University. In the 1990s, he joined the first human rights group for LGBT Iranians, HOMAN, and continued his work until he died of cancer in 2000.

In 2001, an online Iranian LGBT rights organization called "Rainbow" was founded by Arsham Parsi, a well-known Iranian gay activist, followed by a clandestine organization named the "Persian Gay and Lesbian Organization". As of 2008, this group has been renamed as the "Iranian Railroad for Queer Refugees" (IRQR). While the founder of this group had to flee Iran and continue his work as an exile, there is an underground LGBT rights movement in Iran.

Ali Mafi, an openly gay Iranian-born comedian started his career in 2016. In all his shows, Mafi mentions his status as an Iranian citizen and his commitment to being proud of who he is regardless. Mafi currently resides in San Francisco, California, which hosts a prominent gay community.

In 2007, the Canadian CBC TV produced a documentary that interviewed several LGBT Iranians who talked about their struggles.

During protests against the outcome of the Iranian election in July 2009, it was reported that several openly gay Iranians joined crowds of protesters in the United Kingdom and were welcomed with mostly positive attitudes towards LGBT rights.

In 2010, a group of LGBT activists inside Iran declared a day to be Iran Pride Day. The day is on the fourth Friday of July and is and celebrated annually in secret.

As of 2012, OutRight Action International develops an online resource for LGBTIQ Iranians in Persian.

JoopeA organized the Iran in Amsterdam Pride as the Iran Boat in the Amsterdam Gay Pride festival in 2017 and 2018. The Iran Boat won the Best of Pride Amsterdam 2018 award.

HIV/AIDS 
Despite the deeply conservative character of the government in Iran, its efforts to stop the spread of HIV/AIDS have been quite progressive. The first official reports of HIV/AIDS in Iran were reported in 1987, and a government commission was formed, albeit it was not until the 1990s that a comprehensive policy began to arise.

In 1997, Dr. Arash Alaei and his brother, Kamiar, were given permission to open up a small office for HIV/AIDS research among prisoners and with a few years, despite public protests, they helped open the first general HIV/AIDS clinics. A booklet was approved, with explanation of condoms, and distributed to high school students. By the late 1990s, a comprehensive educational campaign existed. Several clinics opened up to offer free testing and counseling. Government funds were allocated to distribute condoms to prostitutes, clean needles and drug rehabilitation to addicts and programs aired on television advocating the use of condoms. While there are shortages, medication is given to all Iranian citizens free of charge.

The Alaei brothers were joined in their educational campaign by Dr. Minoo Mohraz, who was also an early proponent of greater HIV/AIDS education, who chairs a research center in Tehran. Along with government funding, UNICEF has funded several Iranian volunteer based groups that seek to promote greater education about the pandemic and to combat the prejudice that often follows Iranians who have it.

In June 2008, the Alaei brothers were detained, without charge, by the government in Iran, after attending an international conference on HIV/AIDS. The government has since accused the two doctors of attending the conference as part of a larger plotting to overthrow the government.

In 2007, the government in Iran stated that 18,320 Iranians had been infected with HIV, bringing the official number of deaths to 2,800, although critics claimed that the actual number might've been much higher. Officially, drug addiction is the most common way that Iranians become infected.

While educational programs exist for prostitutes and drug addicts, no educational campaign for LGBT people has been allowed to exist. In talking about the situation Kaveh Khoshnood stated, "Some people would be able to talk about their own drug addiction or their family members, but they find it incredibly difficult to talk about homosexuality in any way". "If you're not acknowledging its existence, you're certainly not going to be developing any programs [for gays]".

Asylum cases 
The consequences of a same-sex relationship deemed a punishable crime or even death in Iran, results in a toil that forces many LGBT people to seek asylum in countries where the life situation is better. Many LGBT individuals seek refugee status from the UNHCR to be resettled in Australia, Canada, or the United States.

Some middle-class Iranians have received an education in a Western nation. There is a small population of gay Iranian immigrants who live in Western nations.

In 2001, the United Nations High Commissioner for Human Rights rejected a plea from an Iranian man who escaped from an Iranian prison after being convicted and sentenced to death for the crime of homosexual activity. Part of the problem with this case was that the man had entered the country illegally and was later convicted of killing his boyfriend, after he discovered that he had been unfaithful.

In 2005, the Japanese government rejected an asylum plea from another Iranian gay man. That same year, the Swedish government also rejected a similar claim by an Iranian gay man's appeal. The Netherlands is also going through a review of its asylum policies in regards to Iranians claiming to be victims of the anti-gay policies in Iran.

In 2006, the Netherlands stopped deporting gay men back to Iran temporarily. In March 2006, Dutch Immigration Minister Rita Verdonk said that it was now clear "that there is no question of executions or death sentences based solely on the fact that a defendant is gay", adding that homosexuality was never the primary charge against people. However, in October 2006, after pressure from both within and outside the Netherlands, Verdonk changed her position and announced that Iranian LGBTs would not be deported.

The United Kingdom came under fire for its continued deporting, especially due to news reports documenting gay Iranians who committed suicide when faced with deportation. Some cases have provoked lengthy campaigning on behalf of potential deportees, sometimes resulting in gay Iranians being granted asylum, as in the cases of Kiana Firouz and Mehdi Kazemi.

Views of the government on homosexuality 
Iran's state media have shown hatred toward homosexuals on many occasions. In particular, Mashregh News, a news website "close to the security and intelligence organizations", has described homosexuals in an article as "individuals who have become mentally troubled in natural human tendencies, have lost their balance, and require psychological support and treatment".

In October 2007, the then President of Iran Mahmoud Ahmadinejad, speaking to Columbia University, stated that "In Iran, we don't have homosexuals", though his spokesperson later stated that his comments were misunderstood.

In a November 2007 meeting with his British counterpart, Iranian member of parliament, Mohsen Yahyavi admitted that the government in Iran believes in the death penalty for homosexuality. According to Yahyavi, "if homosexual activity is in private there is no problem, but those in overt activity should be executed".

In a March 2013 interview on the state television, Iran's secretary of High Council for Human Rights, Mohammad-Javad Larijani called homosexuality an "illness" while denying the persecution of gay people in Iran. He stated that "Promoting homosexuality is illegal and we have strong laws against it. ... We consider homosexuality an illness that should be cured. We don't consider it acceptable to beat or mistreat homosexuals, either. ... [Homosexuality] is considered as a norm in the west and they are forcing us to accept it. We are strongly against this."

The Chief Justice of Iran, Sadeq Larijani at a 2014 conference in Tehran denied the execution of gay people in Iran, stating "That they say we execute homosexuals is not more than a lie. ... We do not provide these people with opportunity, but what they say that we hang them is a lie that they have fabricated for the Islamic Republic."

In June 2019, in a press conference held in Tehran between Mohammad Javad Zarif Minister of Foreign Affairs and Heiko Maas Minister of Foreign Affairs, openly gay German journalist Paul Ronzheimer of the tabloid Bild asked Zarif "Why are homosexuals executed in Iran because of their sexual orientation?", to which Zarif seem to affirm that execution of gay people takes place by saying that his "society has principles. And we live according to these principles. These are moral principles concerning the behavior of the people in general, and that means that the law is respected and the law is obeyed."

Films about LGBTQ in Iran 

 I don't like her directed by Javad Daraei
 Facing Mirrors directed by Negar Azarbayjani
 Be Like Others directed by Tanaz Eshaghian.
 White Paper directed by Seyed Mohsen Pourmohseni Shakib.

Human rights reports

United States Department of State

Country Reports on Human Rights Practices of 2017
ChildrenThe review noted many concerns, including discrimination against girls; children with disabilities; unregistered, refugee, and migrant children; and lesbian, gay, bisexual, transgender, and intersex (LGBTI) minors.

Acts of Violence, Discrimination, and Other Abuses Based on Sexual Orientation and Gender IdentityThe law criminalizes consensual same-sex sexual activity, which is punishable by death, flogging, or a lesser punishment. The law does not distinguish between consensual and nonconsensual same sex intercourse, and NGOs reported this lack of clarity led to both the victim and the perpetrator being held criminally liable under the law in cases of assault. The law does not prohibit discrimination based on sexual orientation and gender identity. 
Security forces harassed, arrested, and detained individuals they suspected of being gay or transgender. In some cases security forces raided houses and monitored internet sites for information on LGBTI persons. Those accused of “sodomy” often faced summary trials, and evidentiary standards were not always met. Punishment for same-sex sexual activity between men was more severe than between women. 
According to international and local media reports, on April 13 at least 30 men suspected of homosexual conduct were arrested by IRGC agents at a private party in Isfahan Province. The agents reportedly fired weapons and used electric Tasers during the raid. According to the Canadian-based nonprofit organization Iranian Railroad for Queer Refugees, those arrested were taken to Dastgerd Prison in Isfahan, where they were led to the prison yard and told they would be executed. The Iranian LGBTI activist group 6Rang noted that, following similar raids, those arrested and similarly charged were subjected to forced “anal” or “sodomy” tests and other degrading treatment and sexual insults.

The government censored all materials related to LGBTI issues. Authorities particularly blocked websites or content within sites that discussed LGBTI issues, including the censorship of Wikipedia pages defining LGBTI and other related topics. There were active, unregistered LGBTI NGOs in the country. Hate crime laws or other criminal justice mechanisms did not exist to aid in the prosecution of bias-motivated crimes.

The law requires all male citizens over age 18 to serve in the military, but exempts gay men and transgender individuals, who are classified as having mental disorders. New military identity cards listed the subsection of the law dictating the exemption. According to 6Rang, this practice identified the individuals as gay or transgender and put them at risk of violence and discrimination.

The government provided transgender persons financial assistance in the form of grants of up to 45 million rials $1,240 and loans up to 55 million rials $1,500 to undergo gender reassignment surgery. Additionally, the Ministry of Cooperatives, Labor, and Social Welfare required health insurers to cover the cost of such surgery. Individuals who undergo gender reassignment surgery may petition a court for new identity documents with corrected gender data, which the government reportedly provided efficiently and transparently. NGOs reported that authorities pressured LGBTI persons to undergo gender reassignment surgery.

Summary table

See also 

Human rights in Iran
 LGBT rights in the Middle East
 LGBT rights in Asia
 LGBT history in Iran
Gender Identity Organization of Iran
Be Like Others, a documentary film about transsexuality in Iran
Transgender rights in Iran
Murder of Ali Fazeli Monfared
 Capital punishment for homosexuality

References

Further reading

External links 
 Safra Project Country Information Report Iran. 2004 report, and consider UNHCR report underestimate the pressure. Mentions gender diversity on pp, 15.
The Secret World of Iran's Gay and Lesbian community

 
Persecution of LGBT people